The 1944–45 Iowa State Cyclones men's basketball team represented Iowa State University during the 1944-45 NCAA College men's basketball season. The Cyclones were coached by Louis Menze, who was in his seventeenth season with the Cyclones. They played their home games at the State Gymnasium in Ames, Iowa.

They finished the season 11–5, 8–2 in Big Six play to finish in first place and win the Big Six championship. They lost to Kansas, 50-35 on January 27 to drop their record to 5-5 (2-2) before winning their last six games en route to a conference championship. The March 2, 1945 contest turned into a de facto championship game, with the Cyclones routing the Jayhawks, 61-39, to win their second consecutive Big Six championship.

Jim Myers was awarded with a first team All-Big Six distinction by the United Press, while Bob Mott garnered second team honors.

Roster

Schedule and results 

|-
!colspan=6 style=""|Regular Season

|-

References 

Iowa State Cyclones men's basketball seasons
Iowa State
Iowa State Cyc
Iowa State Cyc